Kirill Yatsevich (born 9 January 1992) is a Russian male  track cyclist, riding for the national team. As a junior he became world champion in the junior road race at the 2010 European Road Championships. He competed in the madison event at the 2011 UCI Track Cycling World Championships.

Major results

2010
 1st  Time trial, UEC European Junior Road Championships
 4th Paris–Roubaix Juniors
2012
 2nd Overall Tour d'Azerbaïdjan
1st Stage 1 (TTT)
 9th Trofeo Internazionale Bastianelli
2013
 3rd ZLM Tour
2014
 3rd Time trial, National Under-23 Road Championships

References

External links
 Profile at ProCyclingStats

1992 births
Living people
Russian track cyclists
Russian male cyclists
Place of birth missing (living people)